Sisaut  is a Rural Municipalities in Sarlahi District in the Madhesh Province of south-eastern Nepal. At the time of the 2011 Nepal census, it had a population of 7,967 people living in 1,283 individual households. It is about 34km away from Mahendra Highway.  It lies 208 km (130 mi) south east of the capital Kathmandu.  Durga-puja during the  Dashain festival is very famous here, many devotees from various villages come to here in the evening.[Sandhya Aarti]. It lies around 18 kilometers west of the district headquarters Malangwa. People form here are kind hearted and self-motivated (no evidence provided). It has a high literate rate as compare to other districts of Madhesh Province (no evidence provided). The number of civil workers[Government Job Holders] is high.
 Developmental works are being done by the representatives of here like MP, Mayor and Wada Chairman. The Present MP of this region[Sarlahi Area no.4] is Dr. Amresh Kumar Singh. The Present Mayor of this Region[Ramnagar rural municipality] is Raja Babu Yadav.[Youngest Mayor of Nepal]. 

Mahadev Temple, Ram Janki Temple, Mahavir Temple, Baudhi Mata Temple, Baraham Baba Temple, etc. are among the religious sites located here. 

Big Haat Bazaar takes place on Sunday and Thursday.

The major occupation of the people living here is farming. Businessman, government job holders, Pandit are also some professions of the people living there.   

There are two governmental and 3-4 private[Boarding] schools.    

Bhojpuri, Bajika, Maithili, Nepali and Hindi are the languages spoken in the village

References

External links
UN map of the municipalities of Sarlahi  District

Populated places in Sarlahi District